is a Japanese former handball player who competed in the 1976 Summer Olympics.

References

1955 births
Living people
Japanese female handball players
Olympic handball players of Japan
Handball players at the 1976 Summer Olympics